Krista Kruuv (born 8 June 1971) is an Estonian sailor. She competed in the 1992 Summer Olympics and the 1996 Summer Olympics.

References

1971 births
Living people
Sportspeople from Tartu
Estonian female sailors (sport)
Olympic sailors of Estonia
Sailors at the 1992 Summer Olympics – Europe
Sailors at the 1996 Summer Olympics – Europe